The 1924 Santa Clara Broncos football team was an American football team that represented Santa Clara University as an independent during the 1924 college football season. In their second and final season under head coach Eddie Kienholz, the Broncos compiled a 3–5–1 record and were outscored by opponents by a total of 96 to 58.

Schedule

References

Santa Clara
Santa Clara Broncos football seasons
Santa Clara Broncos football